The 1993 Little League World Series took place between August 23 and August 28 in Williamsport, Pennsylvania. The United States was represented by the defending series champion and West Region winner, the Long Beach, California Little League. The Latin American Region winner, the David Doleguita Little League of David, Chiriqui, Panama, won the International Championship.

Long Beach defeated Panama 3–2 in the championship game and retained its world championship. Since then, only the Pabao Little League of Willemstad, Curaçao has had the opportunity to repeat; they won the 2004 series but were defeated by the team representing the West Oahu Little League of Ewa Beach, Hawaii in the 2005 championship game.

The Taiwanese winners of the Far East series, and the Dominican winners of the Latin American series were disqualified before the Little League World Series; the Taiwanese for fielding a team that was the only one competing at a school of 2,100 students, in contravention of the rule that requires schools of over 1,000 to field at least four teams per age group if they are to be represented in the Little League World Series, and the Dominicans for using players who failed residency and age requirements.  The Taiwanese team was replaced by the Saipan team from the Northern Mariana Islands and the Dominican squad was replaced by the aforementioned David Doleguita team that was the series runner-up. Jeremy Hess hit a long-drive winning RBI to clinch the title for Long Beach.

Teams

Pool play

Elimination round

Notable players
Sean Burroughs (Long Beach, California) - MLB player from 2002–2012

Champions Path
The Long Beach LL won 15 matches and lost only one match to reach the LLWS. In total their record was 20-1, their only loss coming against Thousand Oaks LL (from California).

References

External links

Little League World Series
Little League World Series
Little League World Series
Little League World Series